Lilac is a color that is a pale violet tone representing the average color of most lilac flowers.   The colors of some lilac flowers may be equivalent to the colors shown below as pale lilac, rich lilac, or deep lilac.  However, there are other lilac flowers that are colored red-violet.

The first recorded use of lilac as an English color name was in 1775.

The color "lilac" has an eponymous book published in 2018 by Coloratura Publisher.

Variations

Pale lilac

Pale lilac is the color represented as lilac in the ISCC-NBS color list. The source of this color is sample 209 in the ISCC-NBS Dictionary of Color Names (1955).

Bright lilac

The color bright lilac (displayed on the right) is the color labeled lilac by Crayola in 1994 as one of the colors in its Magic Scent specialty box of colors.

Rich lilac

Rich lilac, a rich tone of lilac labeled lilac at Pourpre.com (a popular French color list), is shown at right. Another name for this color is bright French lilac.

French lilac

The color French lilac is displayed at right. This color was formulated for use in interior design, where a medium dark violet color is desired. The first recorded use of French lilac as a color name in the English language was in 1814.

The normalized color coordinates for french lilac are identical to pomp and power, first recorded as a color name in English in 1950.

In nature

The lilac-breasted roller is a member of the roller family of birds. It is widely distributed in sub-Saharan Africa and the southern Arabian Peninsula.

In culture

Lilac was a color associated with the final stages of mourning in English and European cultures.

See also 
 List of colors
 Lavender
 Lilac chaser (illusion of visual perception)

References

External links 
 

Shades of violet